Tadayo is a masculine Japanese given name. Notable people with the name include:

, Japanese footballer
, Japanese samurai and daimyō
, Japanese daimyō

Japanese masculine given names